Rohini is a village and a gram panchayat in the Sankrail CD block in the Jhargram subdivision of the Jhargram district, in the state of West Bengal, India.

History 
Zomidar Choudhary Laxmi Narayan Sarangi, son of Jomidar Raybahadur Akshaynarayan Sarangi, ruled in it approximately 100 years ago. He was born on 1877 AD and was  the 3rd Jomidar of Rohini Zamidar /Raj estate. He was the jomidar of Rohini, Datan including 12- 17 more areas. He gave many lands to many temples and schools. He established Rohini CRD High school in village Rohini . He also established a hospital in that area ( Akshay Narayan Databya Chikitsalay ). He gave Hatibandhi Playground and Rohini CRD High school playground to two High schools of Rohini . He gave 40 acres of land to Puri Jagannath Temple Where Tulsi Plants are cultivate for Lord Jagannath .The great person breathed his last on 1949 at the age of 72 .

Mythology
The local persons believe that Lord Rama king of Ayodhya once came here and established a Shiv linga to worship in Rameshwar. A herbal plant Ramdatun spread from Rameshwar.

Geography

Location

Rohini is situated on the banks of the Dulung River which is connected to the Subarnarekha River.

The Rohini gram panchayat contains the following villages:
Rohini
Ranjitpur
HatiBandhi
Akashpura
Praharajpur
Andhari
Tentuli

It has been awarded the Rashtrapati Purashkar (presidential award) for developing a rural drainage system.

Area overview
Jhargram subdivision, the only one in Jhargram district, shown in the map alongside, is composed of  hills, mounds and rolling lands. It is rather succinctly described in the District Human Development Report, 2011 (at that time it was part of Paschim Medinipur district), “The western boundary is more broken and picturesque, for the lower ranges of the Chhotanagpur Hills line the horizon, the jungle assumes the character of forest, and large trees begin to predominate. The soil, however, is lateritic, a considerable area is unproductive, almost uninhabited, especially in the extreme north-west where there are several hills over 1000 feet in height. The remainder of the country is an almost level plain broken only by the sand hills.”3.48% of the population lives in urban areas and 96.52% lives in the rural areas. 20.11% of the total population belonged to scheduled castes and 29.37% belonged to scheduled tribes.

Note: The map alongside presents some of the notable locations in the subdivision. All places marked in the map are linked in the larger full screen map.

Demographics
According to the 2011 Census of India, Rohini had a total population of 1,691 of which 876 (52%) were males and 815 (48%) were females. Population in the age range 0-6 years was 174. The total number of literate persons in Rohini was 1,273 (75.28% of the population over 6 years).

Civic administration

CD block HQ
The headquarters of Sankrail CD block are located at Rohini.

Education
Rohini has the following Educational Institutions:
Rohini Junior Basic School
Rohini C.R.D. High School (HS)
Rohini Valika Vidyalaya (HS)
Rohini Morning Star School

Culture
Rohini is  the birthplace of Rasikananda Mahaprabhu of Vaishnabh religion.

Rohini is known for its cultural heritage and became a center of education after independence by the help of rohini  (raj bari). The library, Ramnarayan Pathagar has helped many researchers with its rich collection of rare books. Ranjitpur is the birthplace of famous contemporary Bengali poet Late Amar Sarangi.

Places to Visit
The following are places of interest in Rohini:
Rameshwar Temple on the bank of Subarnarekha River
Rasikananda Mahaprabhu's birthplace & Temple
Rohini  jomidar bari (raj bari), the palace of Zomidar Choudhary Laxmi Narayan Sarangi
Ramnarayan Pathagar (Ranjitpur)
Picnic Spot on the Subarnarekha river bed developed by Sankrail block

Bhramargarh - connected to an ancient love story
Neel Kuthi- although in ruins
Rohini Shiv and sitala temple, near raj bari 
Radhakanta mandir, near raj bari

References

External links 
 http://www.midnapore.in

Villages in Jhargram district